Jag de Bellouet (born in Argentan, France, on 17 May 1997) is a French former racing trotter by Viking's Way out of Vaunoise by Nicos du Vivier.

His most prestigious victories include the Prix d'Amérique, Prix de Cornulier, Prix de France and  Prix de Paris. At the end of his career, the stallion had earned US$5,457,779 (€4,223,699).

Pedigree

References

French Standardbred racehorses
Harness racing in France